Walverden Water is a minor river in Lancashire, England.

Course
Beginning at Walverden Reservoir, which is fed by Catlow Brook (from the Coldwell Reservoirs near Boulsworth Hill) and its tributaries, the river heads northwest into the town of Nelson. It flows under Scholefield Mill, where it is presumably still met by Clough Head Beck, and continues on through Walverden Park. Shortly afterwards it enters a series of culverts as it passes through the town centre and under the East Lancashire railway line viaduct and the A56 Leeds Road bridge, emerging at Bradley Road and collecting Bradley Syke. It turns to the north and then west and is again culverted, before entering a tunnel under the Leeds and Liverpool Canal and junction 13 of the M65 motorway, emerging next to Nelson and Colne College and shortly after flowing into Pendle Water.

History
Water (OE ) is a common name for a stream, most often found in southern Scotland.

Walverden Water anciently formed the boundary between the manor of Ightenhill and the manor of Colne, also dividing what was then the township of Marsden in two, with Great Marsden to the northeast and Little Marsden on the southwest side. The lord of Clitheroe had a mill on the river in 1311, thought to have been sited near the confluence with Clough Head Beck, and there is also evidence of an ancient fulling mill close to the reservoir. Duchy of Lancaster records show that Richard Towneley of Towneley Hall was prevented from operating a corn mill called Walveden Mill in 1482 (as was his son John in 1495) as it caused a loss to the king's mills at Burnley and Colne.

The first Ordnance Survey map of the area, published in 1848, shows a corn mill with a pond at what was still the small village of Bradley (today the centre of town). Also a little further north, a sluice appears to feed a mill race to a small pond, across the canal at Hodge Bank, the only cotton mill visible, located next to Reedyford House. By the time Nelson developed into a mill town water-power had given way to the steam engine, however these still required a good supply of water. Walverden Mill (built before 1850), Victoria Mill (1857) and Vale Street Shed (1867) were constructed at sites next to the river in the decades that followed.

Although the act that authorised the creation of a compensation reservoir passed in 1866, construction was delayed as all the tenders exceeded the budget of £3196. Consequently, several more cotton mills were built along the river, including: Brook Street Mills (by 1884), Bradley Shed (by 1890), Clover Mill (by 1909), Marsden Mill (by 1909), Scholefield Mill (by 1910) and the Valley Mills (first three built between 1895–1910, No.4 in 1930). As was the Premier Dye Works, which operated from before 1909 until 1963, with the river also vital for its water supply.

In 2010 United Utilities was fined after a blockage caused sewage to leak into the river through a storm overflow for four days in June, causing "a significant amount of pollution that had a serious impact on water quality".
A year-long, Environment Agency led flood-alleviation scheme in the town-centre, completed in 2011, included raising the existing flood walls, the removal of an old weir and sluice and repairs to the walls and culverts with some of the underground sections opened up.

References

Notes

Citations

Rivers of Lancashire
Rivers of the Borough of Pendle
Calder catchment